The Spice Bazaar (meaning "Egyptian Bazaar") in Istanbul, Turkey is one of the largest bazaars in the city. Located in the Eminönü quarter of the Fatih district, it is the most famous covered shopping complex after the Grand Bazaar.

History
There are several documents  suggesting that the name of the bazaar was first "New Bazaar". Then it got its name "Egyptian Bazaar" because it was built with the revenues from the Ottoman eyalet of Egypt in 1660. The word mısır has a double meaning in Turkish: "Egypt" and "maize". This is why sometimes the name is wrongly translated as "Corn Bazaar". The bazaar was (and still is) the center for spice trade in Istanbul, but in recent years shops of other types are gradually replacing the sellers of spices.

The building itself is part of the külliye (complex) of the New Mosque. The revenues obtained from the rented shops inside the bazaar building were used for the upkeeping of the mosque. 

The structure was designed by the court architect Koca Kasım Ağa, but the construction works began under the supervision of another court architect, Mustafa Ağa, in the last months of 1660; following Istanbul's Great Fire of 1660 that began on 24 July 1660 and, lasting for slightly more than two days (circa 49 hours, according to the chronicles of Abdi Pasha), destroyed many neighbourhoods in the city. A major rebuilding and redevelopment effort started in the city following the fire, which included the resumption of the New Mosque's construction works in 1660 (halted between 1603 and 1660, the construction of the mosque was ultimately completed between 1660 and 1665) and the beginning of the Spice Bazaar's construction in the same year (all buildings in the New Mosque külliye, including the Spice Bazaar, were commissioned by Sultana Turhan Hatice, the Valide Sultan (Queen Mother) of Sultan Mehmed IV.)

Egyptian Bazaar today
Spice Bazaar has a total of 85 shops selling spices, Turkish delight and other sweets, jewellery, souvenirs, and dried fruits and nuts.

Gallery

See also
 Bazaari 
 List of streets, hans and gates in Grand Bazaar, Istanbul
 List of shopping malls in Istanbul
 Tabriz Bazaar, the largest covered bazaar in the world.

References

Sources

External links

 Egyptian Bazaar Photos with information
 Buying Spices in Istanbul's Egyptian Bazaar - illustrated article in English
 Points From Turkey, Istanbul - Egyptian Spice Bazaar

Bazaars in Turkey
Buildings and structures completed in 1660
Ottoman architecture in Istanbul
Fatih
Golden Horn
Spice Bazaar
1660 establishments in the Ottoman Empire